Tau Kappa Epsilon, commonly known as  or Teke, is a social college fraternity founded on January 10, 1899, at Illinois Wesleyan University. The organization has chapters throughout the United States and Canada, making the Fraternity an international organization. Since its founding in 1899, Tau Kappa Epsilon Fraternity has never had an exclusionary or discriminatory clause to prevent individuals from joining and has instead admitted members based on their "personal worth and character". As of fall 2022, there are 222 active  chapters and colonies with over 296,000 lifetime members.

While Tau Kappa Epsilon is primarily mentioned as a collegiate fraternity, the organization emphasizes that it is a "Fraternity for Life". Many chapters have active alumni associations that support philanthropic causes, mentor collegiate members, and host social events. Famous Teke alumni that continued their involvement with the Fraternity include NFL quarterback Terry Bradshaw, country music singer Willie Nelson, and U.S. President Ronald Reagan.

Tau Kappa Epsilon provides support for numerous philanthropies and charitable services, most notably St. Jude Children's Research Hospital, which was founded by Danny Thomas, a member of the Gamma-Nu Chapter at the University of Toledo. In 2019, Tau Kappa Epsilon increased its commitment towards St. Jude Children's Research Hospital with pledging to raise $10 million within the next 10 years. As of July 2022,  has raised $3.3 million towards this commitment.

History

Founding

On January 10, 1899, Charles Roy Atkinson, Clarence Arthur Mayer, James Carson McNutt, Joseph Lorenzo Settles, and Owen Ison Truitt met at 504 East Locust Street in Bloomington, Illinois, to draw up the first constitution for a new fraternity at Illinois Wesleyan University. The purpose of the new organization was to be an "aid to college men in mental, moral and social development". The founders sought to be a different organization than the other fraternities at the time by establishing a fraternity where membership would be based on personal worth and character rather than wealth, rank, or honor. Mental development would be emphasized by the study of classic literature at weekly meetings, and thus the new fraternity became known as the Knights of Classic Lore. The first public announcement of the Knights of Classic Lore appeared in the February 1, 1899, issue of the Argus, which is the student publication of Illinois Wesleyan University.

During formation, the Knights of Classic Lore were trying to get the Illinois Epsilon chapter of Phi Delta Theta restored. Prominent Phi Delt alumnus Richard Henry Little became a persistent sponsor for the Knights to petition Phi Delta Theta for a charter. The Knights first petitioned Phi Delta Theta at its 1902 convention in New York, but efforts were unsuccessful. After renting rooms at several locations beginning in the spring of 1899, the Knights of Classic Lore finally acquired its first fraternity house, known as The Wilder Mansion, in September 1902. Simultaneously with the acquisition of the new house, the Knights also adopted the name Tau Kappa Epsilon. The change in name was expected to create a better impression in future petitions to Phi Delta Theta. The second petition was presented at the Indianapolis convention of 1904, but it was withdrawn in an effort to gain unanimous support of all chapters in Phi Delta Theta's Zeta Province, which included Colorado, Illinois, Iowa, Kansas, Nebraska, Minnesota, and Wisconsin. If this support was achieved, then the charter would be granted to the group without any action from the convention. The Knights of Classic Lore gained the support of all Phi Delta Theta groups in the province, except for Wisconsin Alpha, Illinois Beta, and Missouri Alpha. The Knights in turn unsuccessfully presented the petition at the 1906 convention in Washington, D.C. During the continuing struggle for acceptance from Phi Delta Theta,  continued to grow stronger in its own existence.

In late 1907,  was preparing to petition Phi Delta Theta once again at the 1908 convention when an event took place that would forever change the course of history for the fraternity. At the annual initiation banquet on October 19, 1907, speeches were made that both advocated and questioned the continued petitioning of Phi Delta Theta. At the banquet, Wallace G. McCauley delivered a blistering speech known as "Opportunity Out of Defeat". The powerful address called for an abandonment of the petitioning initiative and a new campaign to make  into a national fraternity itself. While there was some opposition at the time, the movement ultimately took hold, and by 1908,  was well on its way to becoming a national fraternity in its own right. The speech was published in the first issue of The Teke in January 1908, and by November of that year, work was beginning on a new constitution. At the chapter meeting held on Monday, February 15, 1909, the new constitution became official. The first Conclave of the Grand Chapter of the new national fraternity of Tau Kappa Epsilon convened on February 17, 1909.

Expansion
In 1909,  approached the Chi Rho Sigma Fraternity at Millikin University. There were no national fraternities at Millikin at this time, and  had just established its intentions to become a national fraternity. Representatives from  presented their case, and after thorough consideration, Chi Rho Sigma voted to accept 's offer. Following the installation of the Gamma Chapter, The Teke magazine noted that the triangle was completed. The geographic location of 's first three chapters form a perfect equilateral triangle. The equilateral triangle was at that time, and continues to be, the primary symbol of Tau Kappa Epsilon.

Prior to 1939,  chapters were installed after local fraternities petitioned  for approval. In 1939, a colonization process was established to promote expansion and to ensure that potential chapters met all necessary requirements prior to installation. The first two  colonies were the Eta Colony at the University of Kansas and the Chi Beta Colony at the University of Missouri.

Tau Kappa Epsilon expanded for the first time into the Deep South region of the United States in 1946. This expansion was made possible when Alpha Lambda Tau, a small predominantly Southern national fraternity, announced its dissolution.

Presidential recognition

On January 20, 1981, Tau Kappa Epsilon member Ronald Reagan was sworn in as the 40th President of the United States. Reagan joined  at the Iota Chapter at Eureka College in 1929. Through his time as President of the United States, Reagan remained actively involved in Tau Kappa Epsilon.

In 1983, President Reagan created the Ronald Reagan Leadership Award to recognize selected student members of  that have demonstrated superior academic and leadership accomplishments.

In March 1984, President Reagan sponsored a  alumni luncheon at the White House. At the luncheon, Reagan was awarded 's Order of the Golden Eagle and the Gold Medal of the North American Interfraternity Conference (NIC) recognizing his lifelong efforts to support and promote college fraternities. Reagan was the first Teke and first U.S. president to receive the Gold Medal of the NIC.

During the Spring Quarter of 1985 at the Alpha-Omega Chapter (UCLA), Frater Reagan was hosted to an informal reception by the Chapter's active members. There was no pre-screening of the house or its members by the Secret Service.  Photos were taken to commemorate the event and the meeting was both up-building to the Chapter and to Frater Reagan. Coincidentally and as of June 2010, the brand-new UCLA Medical Center was named in his honor (Ronald Reagan UCLA Medical Center), a leading teaching and research hospital, and is a stone's throw from the Chapter house.

In October 1984, President Reagan attended lunch at the  house at the Ohio State University. The Ohio State Chapter hosted President Reagan for lunch following a rally in which he was speaking at Ohio State.

In June 1988, President Reagan hosted a special  ceremony in the Oval Office of the White House in which he presented the Ronald Reagan Leadership Award/Scholarship to  member Alan Friel. During the ceremony at the White House, President Reagan was presented with 's Order of the Silver Maple Leaf by  Grand Prytanis Bruce Melchert.

Responding to changes
By the late 1980s, public perception of fraternities and their conduct was deteriorating, which affected recruitment and membership growth across many of Tau Kappa Epsilon's chapters. In response, the Grand Chapter of Tau Kappa Epsilon voted to eliminate traditional pledging and implement several membership development programs including a formal candidate education program and membership quality boards (MQBs), which were constituted at each chapter to review membership conduct.

The fraternity continued to enact various changes to its structure and operations throughout the remainder of the 20th century. In 1991, the Grand Chapter of Tau Kappa Epsilon voted to abolish female auxiliary groups associated with chapters, also known as "Little Sisters". Membership decline continued throughout most of the 1990s, which prompted the fraternity to respond with additional long-range plans to boost membership recruitment and minimize risk management costs.

The early 21st century brought a reinvigoration of the fraternity. Considerable resources were invested to upgrade the fraternity's infrastructure, improve its communication strategy, and reorganize professional staff across the United States and Canada. In the following years, Tau Kappa Epsilon saw improvements in numerous areas of the fraternity including average chapter size, philanthropy projects, and public service hours.

Symbols and traditions

Apollo
The mythological ideal or patron of Tau Kappa Epsilon is Apollo, an important and complex Olympian deity in Greek and Roman mythology. Apollo is the Greek god of music and culture, of light and truth, the ideals toward which the organization strives for in their development of manhood.

Badge

The official membership badge, made of gold and adorned with three white pearls, is by far the most important item of  insignia in general use. This badge may be worn only by initiated members. Jeweled badges, crown set with pearls, diamonds, rubies or emeralds, according to choice, may be worn by alumni members. Frequently the standard membership badge is used as a token of engagement. Miniature badges are also available for mothers, sisters, wives, chapter sweethearts or for engagement purposes. The  'badge of gold,' unique in its design and distinctiveness, has never been changed since its adoption.

Red carnation
The red carnation is the flower of the fraternity. From this flower the color for the coat-of-arms, flag, and other symbols are derived. Red carnations are also worn at  banquets. The Red Carnation Ball is a dance that many chapters celebrate, and is named after the flower.

Coat-of-arms
The coat-of-arms may be used only by official members of the Fraternity on stationery, jewelry, and other personal effects. Modified slightly several times during the early years of Tau Kappa Epsilon, the present Coat-of-Arms, adopted in 1926, was designed by Dr. Carlton B. Pierce and Ms. Emily Butterfield.

Flag

The present design of the  flag, as adopted at the 1961 Conclave, features five voided triangles, in cherry red, on a gray bend surmounting a cherry field. Because it is patterned after the shield of the fraternity Coat-of-Arms, the flag is readily associated with Tau Kappa Epsilon. Individual chapters may also purchase and use pennants and wall banners of various designs. These usually employ the name or Greek letters of the fraternity and chapter, and may incorporate the basic  insignia.  insignia may be purchased only from the Offices of the Grand Chapter or a merchant licensed by the fraternity headquarters.

The Horseshoe
In April 1921, members of the Fraternity at Ohio State University made their way to the Conclave in Madison, Wisconsin. At the conclusion of the vote granting their charter as the Omicron Chapter, one of the members pulled from the pocket of his pants a rusty horseshoe which the fraters had picked up along the way. Believing that the horseshoe had granted the chapter good luck, the tradition began to pass the horseshoe down to each chapter. The original horseshoe was lost during World War II at the Alpha-Chi Chapter (University of Louisville), but it was replaced with a new horseshoe to continue the tradition.

In mid-1995, the original horseshoe was discovered by Past Grand Prytanis Rodney Williams among some artifacts belonging to the Alpha-Chi Chapter, which had been held for years by a charter member of the chapter. At the 49th Biennial Conclave, the original  horseshoe from the Omicron Chapter was displayed, and the story behind its loss explained.

The horseshoe, now an adopted symbol, is traditionally displayed on a plaque given to new chapters at their founding.

The Sweetheart Song
The tradition of singing a Sweetheart Song to a fraternity's sweetheart is one shared by most fraternities.  is rare in that it has three different Sweetheart Songs (Sweetheart of T.K.E., recorded by The Lettermen in   1969, found on I Have Dreamed (The Lettermen album); Iota Sweetheart Song  and the Old Sweetheart Song). The Old Sweetheart Song was started at the Alpha-Xi Chapter (Drake University) in Des Moines, Iowa.

Grand Council
The Board of Directors of the Fraternity is known as the Grand Council, which is composed of the Grand Prytanis (Grand President) and seven other Grand Officers elected at Conclave, one representative selected by the Collegiate Advisory Committee (CAC), and two other alumni selected by the Grand Officers as ex-officio, voting members. The Grand Council is entrusted with authority over managing the property, assets, and finances of the Fraternity, adopting budgets and financial estimates, proposing amendments to the Fraternity's Articles of Incorporation, and authorizing the establishment of colonies or affiliated local fraternities. The Grand Council also oversees the Chief Executive Officer (CEO) of the International Fraternity who manages day-to-day operations, subject to the direction and control of the Grand Council.

The CAC and its chairman are active undergraduate members appointed by the CEO of the Fraternity and approved by several past Grand Prytani (Grand Presidents) to act as advisers to the Grand Council with the CAC chairman serving on the Grand Council.

Due to the COVID-19 pandemic, Conclave 2021 was postponed to 2022 as declared in the Fraternity's Statement of Emergency, which resulted in the officers of the Grand Council serving beyond their normal 2-year term. In September 2021, Grand Prytanis Dr. James Hickey announced his retirement, and Ted W. Bereswill succeeded him as the new Grand Prytanis until Conclave 2022.

Current officers
The below table lists the current Grand Council officers and members.

Past Grand Prytani
Every Grand Prytanis, or Grand President, serves for a two-year term after being elected at Conclave. However, early fraternity elections were yearly and some elections were irregular or interrupted, such as during the two World Wars and the COVID-19 pandemic. Previous Grand Prytani are listed below.

 Lester H. Martin (1909–1910), (1910–1911)
 William Wilson (1911–1912), (1912–1913)
 L.W. Tuesberg (1913–1914), (1914–1915)
 Lyle F. Straight (1915–1916), (1916–1917)
 Oscar G. Hoose (1917–1918)
 Harrold P. Flint (1918–1919), (1919–1920), (1920–1921)
 W.D. Reeve (1921–1922), (1922–1923)
 Philip H. McGrath (1923–1924), (1924–1926)
 Miles Gray (1926–1928)
 Milton M. Olander (1928–1930)
 Eugene C. Beach (1930–1935)
 Don A. Fisher (1935–1937)
 Clarence E. Smith (1937–1939)
 Herbert Helble (1939–1941)
 L.W. Tuesberg (1941–1942)
 Charles E. Nieman (1942–1944)
 R.C. Williams (1944–1947), (1947–1949)
 Leland F. Leland (1949–1951)
 Sophus C. Goth (1951–1953)
 James C. Logan (1953–1955), (1955–1957)
 Frank B. Scott (1957–1959)
 Don Kaser (1959–1961), (1961–1963)
 J. Russel Salsbury (1963–1965), (1965–1966)
 Donald H. Becker (1966–1967), (1967–1969), (1969–1971)
 Lenwood S. Cochran (1971–1973)
 William A. Quallich (1973–1975)
 William H. Wisdom (1975–1977)
 William V. Muse (1977–1979)
 Rodney Williams, Jr. (1979–1981)
 John A. Courson (1981–1983)
 Dwayne R. Woerpel (1983–1985)
 Joel E. Johnson (1985–1987)
 Bruce B. Melchert (1987–1989)
 James S. Margolin (1989–1991)
 Robert J. Borel (1991–1993)
 John R. Fisher (1993–1995)
 Thomas M. Castner (1995–1997)
 Gary A. LaBranche (1997–1999)
 Lon G. Justice (1999–2001)
 Robert D. Planck (2001–2003)
 Mark C. Romig (2003–2005)
 Mark A. Fite (2005–2007)
 Mark K. Johnson (2007–2009)
 Herbert L. Songer (2009–2011)
 Edmund C. Moy (2011–2013)
 Bob Barr (2013–2015)
 Rodney G. Talbot (2015–2017)
 Christopher T. Hanson (2017–2019)
 Dr. James Hickey (2019–2021)
 Ted W. Bereswill (2021–2022)

Notable alumni

The list of Tau Kappa Epsilon brothers spans over multiple careers including politics, business, athletics, and entertainment. Among the most recognized include U.S. President Ronald Reagan who was the recipient of the Order of the Golden Eagle, the fraternity's highest honor. Other widely recognized political figures include former West Virginia Senator Robert Byrd, who at the time of his death was the longest-serving member in the history of the United States Congress, and former Arkansas Governor and Republican presidential candidate Mike Huckabee, who while running for president launched a -specific website and visited Tekes on the campaign trail.

Dozens of top CEOs and university presidents have also made the list such as Howard Schultz of Starbucks, Marc Benioff of Salesforce, and Steve Forbes of Forbes magazine, who was the fraternity's 250,000th initiate. Numerous athletic and music superstars are also Tekes including NFL quarterbacks Terry Bradshaw, Phil Simms, and Aaron Rodgers, Olympians Douglas Blubaugh, Sim Iness, and Johnny Quinn, and singers Elvis Presley, Willie Nelson, and the Everly Brothers.

Chapters and colonies

 chapters and colonies are individual organizations of initiated members associated with a university or college. After the first, or single-letter Alpha series, chapters are named with a two-letter Greek letter combination in alphabetical order of the Greek alphabet, such as Alpha-Alpha, Beta-Alpha, etc. The Greek letter "Eta" was skipped over as a named series. Naming occurs according to the date of when the chapter's charter was granted. In one exception to this general rule, the group that would have been the Sigma chapter received special permission to be referred to as the Scorpion chapter, honoring the name of a long-standing local affiliate into the Fraternity.

A colony is defined as an unchartered organization of the Fraternity until officially granted a charter by the Grand Council, which is the board of directors of the Fraternity. Once a colony has obtained at least 20 qualified members and has petitioned for a charter, the Grand Council may grant a charter by a two-thirds vote. As of 2022, "colonies" are officially referred to as "emerging chapters" by the Fraternity.

Chapters may have become inactive after being granted a charter, due to membership decline, misconduct, or school closure. In some cases, the Fraternity and alumni volunteers may restore a dormant chapter using the same chapter name. Numerous chapters that were once closed have recolonized and have successfully reestablished themselves in their school and community.

Tau Kappa Epsilon is also affiliated with the German fraternity system known as the Corps of the Weinheimer Senioren-Convent (WSC). The WSC serves as an umbrella organization for 60 student Corps at 22 cities all over Germany. In furtherance of this International fraternal friendship, Past Executive Vice President Timothy J. Murphy became part of Corps Franconia Darmstadt (Darmstadt Technical University) receiving the status of "Inhaber der Corpsschleife" (IdC), a rarity for a foreign national. He has since spoken at fraternity congresses and gatherings in Weinheim and Würzburg, Germany.

Local chapter or member misconduct
Chapters or members occasionally make news for negative or harmful choices, with situations ranging from full-on tragedies to more benign rule-breaking. Where these occur the range of outcomes can include individual and chapter suspension, lawsuits and possibly even closure. With a combination of risk management techniques, education and mentor focus, ΤΚΕ nationally has banned and renounced hazing as inconsistent with fraternity values. Regular member education is used to raise awareness and redirect behaviors away from prohibited conduct. The Fraternity similarly promotes awareness of the dangers and harm caused by violence and sexual abuse. Likewise its national rules require that chapters and members adhere to local legislation regarding alcohol and substance abuse. Nevertheless, the following events have been cited as impacting chapters and their communities:

2020
The Central Michigan University chapter was placed on suspension due to alcohol and hazing violations.

2019
The University of Georgia chapter was suspended after a video surfaced of members using racial slurs and mocking slavery.

The Oregon State University chapter was suspended following an investigation on several reported hazing incidents. While the fraternity house was left vacant, the Corvallis police arrested two homeless people found in the house on charges of first degree burglary, theft of services, second degree criminal mischief and unlawful possession of methamphetamine.

The Sonoma State University chapter was banned from campus for five years following a hazing investigation.

The California Polytechnic State University chapter was banned from campus after a hazing investigation revealed pledges were forced to drink alcohol and do push ups.

2018
A member of the Indiana University chapter was arrested for selling illegal drugs in the fraternity house and off-campus.

The University of Nevada-Reno chapter was suspended for one year following information of its membership songs that promote violence toward women and other fraternity men on campus.

The Ohio State University chapter was suspended for three years after a thorough investigation found the chapter guilty of hazing, endangering behavior, and improper use of alcohol.

2017
The Florida International University chapter was suspended for two years after a thorough investigation found the chapter of Tau Kappa Epsilon had violated the university's student code of conduct, following the release of screenshots depicting "inappropriate content" in the group's  private chat, where the fraternity's group chat revealed photos of nude women, which had been shared without their consent, and offensive statements including Holocaust memes, jokes about rape and pedophilia and conversations about drug sales. The fraternity also got in trouble for hosting a tailgate party where a minor was served alcohol. As a result, Florida International University enacted a month-long suspension of all fraternities and sororities on campus, while the administration reformed the policies concerning Greek Life.

2016
The Towson University chapter was suspended after WBAL News Radio reported that a student was "forced to eat cat food and a liquid he was told was vinegar and pickle juice by members of Tau Kappa Epsilon fraternity" and that "the student started vomiting blood hours later and was taken to a nearby hospital later that day".

The Florida State University chapter was suspended for hazing and misconduct violations. The pledges were forced to participate in a hazing activity called "Old South" where pledges acted like slaves in blackface while serving drinks to members. Also the pledges were twice blindfolded and dropped off hours away from campus without their wallets and cellphones and then told to find their way back to campus.

The University of Maryland chapter was kicked off campus due to the distribution of a video showing disturbing hazing rituals.

2015
The Northwest Missouri State University chapter had a member arrested and charged with first degree rape of a female student at the fraternity house on campus. The chapter was placed on suspension for the incident.

The California State University, Northridge chapter was kicked off campus until July 2018 due to hazing and sexual misconduct.

The Quinnipiac University chapter was kicked off campus due to "serious" allegations of hazing.

2014
The Arizona State University chapter was expelled by the university after photos surfaced of a racially themed "MLK Black Party" on Martin Luther King Jr. Day holiday weekend, although it later surfaced that the event was not planned by members of the fraternity. The party included guests wearing basketball jerseys, flashing gang signs, and drinking from watermelon cups. The school's decision to ban the chapter was also because the  chapter had recently been placed on probation after two members of the fraternity pleaded guilty to the aggravated assault of a student from another fraternity. The national fraternity issued an apology and condemned the event but insisted that the party was "without malice or forethought", that there were fewer than 30 men and women at the event which didn't meet Arizona State IFC guidelines for an official fraternity function, and that the ASU chapter was one of the most "multi-cultural social fraternities" at the university.

The Rowan University chapter had two men suspended for an illicit sex tape recorded in the fraternity house that was leaked to the public.

The California State University San Marcos chapter was suspended after several different complaints of sexual assault and date rape were made against the fraternity.

The University of Wisconsin–Milwaukee chapter was suspended after several women falsely accused the fraternity of drugging and raping them at the fraternity house. One fraternity member was arrested for possession of marijuana.

The Johnson & Wales University chapter had a former pledge sue the fraternity after a brutal hazing ritual that left him hospitalized for over a month. He was branded, urinated on by members, paddled, deprived of sleep, forced to exercise, forced to swim in his own vomit, and asked to participate in a host of many other demeaning activities. He was the only remaining pledge after the rest of his pledge class dropped due to abuse and harassment perpetuated by members of the fraternity.

2013
The American University chapter was disciplined for forcing pledges to binge drink, smoke marijuana, and perform various humiliating tasks.

The Arizona State University chapter was placed on probation after 20  members attacked three members of the Delta Kappa Epsilon (DKE) fraternity. One DKE member was beaten so badly that he had to be transferred to an emergency room with a concussion and broken jaw.

2012
The Butler University chapter was shut down and placed on probation for an undisclosed period of time. School administrators at the time did not release a reason for the chapter's closure.

2011
The Radford University chapter made national headlines after a pledge died partaking in a drinking hazing ritual. Six members of the fraternity were arrested and charged for his death.

The Whitman College chapter was publicly accused of abusing and mistreating pledges by a former pledge. The former pledge stated that misconduct by the fraternity was the reason why many members of his pledge class quit the fraternity.

pre-2011
In 2000, the San Diego State University chapter was expelled for four years after a drinking hazing ritual hospitalized a pledge with alcohol poisoning.

In 1996, the La Salle University chapter was suspended after a group from the chapter assaulted members of the Phi Kappa Theta fraternity. The  chapter's charter was subsequently revoked.

Publications

The Teke
The Teke is the award-winning official quarterly publication for undergraduate and alumni brothers of Tau Kappa Epsilon. The magazine features in-depth articles related to topics of interest for  members, including chapter news, alumni news, service and foundation annual reports, and articles relating to leadership, professional development, chapter operations, and of general interest to the fraternal world. In the speech, McCauley stated, "Then let us issue a magazine, quarterly as first, name it The Teke, make it attractive and artistic in form." The Teke magazine first appeared in January 1908. The first edition was a 20-page booklet of 7 by 10 inches bound with a gray cover and the title The Teke within a red triangle. Illustrations and photos were first used in Volume II, No. 2 of The Teke. The magazine expanded to the 8.5 by 11.5 inch size in 1935. The Teke was suspended in the 1990s amid financial difficulties for the fraternity, but it was re-established in 1999.

The Teke Guide
The pledge manual of Tau Kappa Epsilon is known as The Teke Guide. Development on the manual began in 1927, and The Teke Guide was first published in 1935. The Teke Guide was the first fraternity pledge manual to use a two color printing process. The original book was designed, compiled, and edited by Grand Histor Leland F. Leland. Through the 1950s, The Teke Guide was a spiral bound book of nearly 150 pages. The book was rich with illustrations, including photos of all  chapter houses. In 1966, a new hard cover version of The Teke Guide debuted; however, the new version contained significantly reduced content and very few photos. By the 1980s, The Teke Guide had been reduced to a soft cover magazine-like format. The hard cover format returned again by the 1990s, and over the next few years an effort was made to restore the in-depth historical content and photographs that had been stripped from previous versions in order to make the book more of a permanent  reference manual for the life of each member. In 2007, the first edition to be printed in full color was issued.

See also
 List of social fraternities and sororities
 List of Tau Kappa Epsilon brothers
 List of Tau Kappa Epsilon chapters and colonies

References

External links
Official website

 
Bloomington–Normal
Fraternities and sororities based in Indianapolis
Illinois Wesleyan University
Student organizations established in 1899
Student societies in the United States
Active former members of the North American Interfraternity Conference
1899 establishments in Illinois